Ahmed Zaad is a Maldivian footballer, who is currently playing for Club Valencia in Dhivehi Premier League.

International career
Zaad made his debut for the Maldives' senior team in a friendly match against Pakistan on 14 February 2013, coming on to play in the 88th minute, replacing Mohamed Arif.

References

External links
 
 Ahmed Zaad at maldivesoccer.com
 

Living people
Maldivian footballers
Maldives international footballers
Club Valencia players
1988 births
Association football midfielders
T.C. Sports Club players
Club Eagles players